Tiran Wijesooriya (born 13 July 1994) is a Sri Lankan cricketer. He made his first-class debut for Sinhalese Sports Club in the 2015–16 Premier League Tournament on 25 February 2016.

References

External links
 

1994 births
Living people
Sri Lankan cricketers
Sinhalese Sports Club cricketers
Cricketers from Colombo